Høgstolen is a mountain in Møre og Romsdal county, Norway.

Høgstolen lies within the Reinheimen National Park, between the mountains Puttegga and Karitind. The name is not unique to this mountain, as there are other (lower) mountains with the same name in  Norway.

See also
List of mountains of Norway

References

Rauma, Norway
Fjord (municipality)
Mountains of Møre og Romsdal